The blackish small-eared shrew (Cryptotis nigrescens) is a species of shrew in the family Soricidae. It is found in parts of Costa Rica, El Salvador, Guatemala, Honduras, Mexico, and Panama. An example specific habitat is the Petenes mangroves of the Yucatán.

References

 World Wildlife Fund. 2010. Petenes mangroves. eds. Mark McGinley, C.Michael Hogan & C.Cleveland. Encyclopedia of Earth. National Council for Science and the Environment. Washington DC

Cryptotis
Mammals of Central America
Mammals of Mexico
Taxonomy articles created by Polbot
Mammals described in 1895